Wolfgang Ludwig Krafft (25 August 1743 – 20 November 1814) was a German astronomer and physicist. He is the namesake of the lunar crater Krafft which has a diameter of 51 km.

External links
USGS Astrogeology

1743 births
1814 deaths
18th-century German astronomers
18th-century German physicists